Geneviève Brouillette (born August 23, 1969 in Saint-Hyacinthe, Quebec) is a French Canadian television and film actress from Saint-Hyacinthe, Quebec.

Since 1998 she has gradually appeared in film and she appeared in A Sunday in Kigali in 2006.

Filmography
1983: Entre chien et loup
1991: Montreal Stories
1993: Blanche: Marie-Ange
1995: 4 et demi...: Daphné Saint-Amour
1995: Black List (Liste noire): Gabrielle Angers
1996: Jasmine: Antonia Valiquette
1996: Urgences: Beatrice
1997: Un gars, une fille: Geneviève
1997: Diva: Clara Baly
1998: You Can Thank Me Later: Nurse
1998: The Countess of Baton Rouge (La Comtesse de Bâton Rouge): Paula Paul de Nerval
2000: Le Monde de Charlotte: Marcia
2001: Wedding Night (Nuit de noces): Florence
2002: Rumeurs: Hélène Charbonneau
2003: Père et fils: Hélène
2005: The United States of Albert (Les États-Unis d'Albert)
2005: Miss Météo
2006: A Sunday in Kigali (Un dimanche à Kigali): Consul
2011: Funkytown
2012: L'Affaire Dumont
2020: The Sticky Side of Baklava (La Face cachée du baklava)

External links

1969 births
Canadian film actresses
Canadian television actresses
French Quebecers
Living people
People from Saint-Hyacinthe
Actresses from Quebec